Trude Dothan (‎; 12 October 1922 – 28 January 2016) was an Israeli archaeologist who focused on the Late Bronze and Iron Ages in the region, in particular in Philistine culture.

Biography
Trude Krakauer (later Dothan) was born in Vienna. She immigrated with her parents to Mandatory Palestine at the age of one. In Jerusalem, they joined the local community of intellectuals and artists, many of them German speakers. Her father, Leopold Krakauer (1890–1954), was an artist and architect who designed several Bauhaus-style buildings for Jerusalem's "garden city" of Rehavia; her mother Grete (née Wolf, 1890–1970) was a painter.
She attended the Rehavia Gymnasium for her high school education.

In 1951 she married Moshe Dothan (1919–1999), a fellow archaeologist with whom she shared interest in biblical archaeology and particularly the Philistine culture. They had two children together, one of them Dan was vocalist for the Israeli rock and new wave band HaClique. She died on 28 January 2016, aged 93.

Academic and archaeology career
A professor at Hebrew University of Jerusalem from 1977, she held the Eliezer Sukenik Chair of Archeology and headed the Berman Center of Biblical Archaeology.  Her private collection of books is now in the Lanier Theological Library, Houston, Texas.

Awards and recognition
1991 – Percia Schimmel Award in archaeology, awarded by the Israel Museum.
1998 – Israel Prize, for archaeology.
2003 – an honorary PhD from the Hebrew Union College, Jerusalem.

Published works
The Philistines and Their Material Culture, 1982
People of the Sea: Search for the Philistines (with Moshe Dothan), 1992
Deir el-Balah: Uncovering an Egyptian Outpost in Canaan from the Time of the Exodus

See also
List of Israel Prize recipients
Women of Israel

References

External links

Biography at Jewish Women's Archive

1922 births
2016 deaths
Austrian Jews
Jews in Mandatory Palestine
Israeli Jews
Austrian emigrants to Mandatory Palestine
Hebrew University of Jerusalem alumni
Academic staff of the Hebrew University of Jerusalem
Israeli archaeologists
Israel Prize women recipients
Israel Prize in archaeology recipients
Israeli women scientists